The Thaw is a 1931 Soviet film directed by Boris Barnet.

Plot 
Kulak's son attracts the attention of Anka, the daughter of a poor man. She falls in love with him, Anka becomes pregnant, but the young man throws her. Her life changes when Komsomol Semyon returns home from service in the army.

Starring 
 Vera Marinich as Anka
 Aleksandr Zhukov as Skulov
 Anton Martynov as Semen
 S. Pryanishnikov as Tarkhanov

References

External links 

1931 films
1930s Russian-language films
Soviet drama films
1931 drama films
Soviet black-and-white films